Home Fires is a British period television drama about the life of Women's Institute members on the Home Front during the Second World War. Set in a rural Cheshire community called Great Paxford, the series is produced by ITV, and launched its first series in May 2015. The first series is set between September 1939 and early 1940.

The series was inspired by the book Jambusters by Julie Summers. With the first series having an average viewing ratings of 6.2 million ITV commissioned a second six-part series, aired in April 2016. The show focuses on a largely female cast, including notable actresses Francesca Annis, Samantha Bond, Claire Rushbrook, Fenella Woolgar and Leanne Best.

Series 2 of Home Fires premiered on 2 April 2016 and gained 5.2 million views with a 23.7% share. In May 2016 ITV announced it would not be renewing the show.

Cast and characters
Francesca Annis as Joyce Cameron. Joyce is a pillar of the community, and the historical leader of the Great Paxford Women's Institute. Joyce is sophisticated and serene, and even her ex-nemesis Frances observes that she is a natural leader. Even though she can appear stern, pompous and vindictive, she is actually quite sympathetic to other people and proves herself to be a substantially good person.
Daisy Badger as Claire Wilson (née Hillman). The former maid of Joyce Cameron and current maid of Frances Barden.
Mark Bazeley as Bob Simms. An aspiring author following the minor success of his first book. He was a journalist in the First World War and suffered injuries to his arm and leg from shrapnel, though he admits it was nowhere near combat. Volatile, self-centered and pathetic, Bob is physically and emotionally abusive to his wife Pat.
Leanne Best as Teresa Fenchurch. Great Paxford's new local teacher. She becomes a tenant in Alison Scotlock's home.
Samantha Bond as Frances Barden. Leader of the WI. 
Clare Calbraith as Steph Farrow. A farming wife who comes to enthusiastically support the WI after some initial reluctance to join. Steph is very happy with her husband and only wants what is best for him; when he decides to enlist, she supports him through love rather than reason. 
Chris Coghill as Stanley Farrow. The local farmer and Steph's husband. He is brave and wants to enlist in the war, despite having unpleasant memories of the last conflict in which he served. Stanley loves his wife and son (also named Stanley) and works hard to provide for them. 
Ruth Gemmell as Sarah Collingborne. Frances Barden's sister and a member of the WI. She is the wife of the local vicar.
Frances Grey as Erica Campbell. Wife of Dr. Will Campbell and the local pharmacist. 
Rachel Hurd-Wood as Kate Campbell. First daughter of Erica and Will Campbell. Vivacious and outgoing, she is more extroverted than her sister Laura. 
Leila Mimmack as Laura Campbell. The second daughter of Will and Erica Campbell. 
Mike Noble as Spencer Wilson. The local postman. Spencer takes a fancy to Claire after coming to her rescue in a bicycling accident. He is cheery and supports the WI's new form. 
Claire Price as Miriam Brindsley. The wife of local butcher Bryn, and a member of the WI. The thought of war terrifies her, as she knows it will eventually take away her son David. 
Claire Rushbrook as Pat Simms. A member of the WI. A battered wife, she has been a victim of her husband Bob's physical and verbal abuse for many years. She makes every effort to keep him happy, but remains with him out of fear, lying about and making apologies for his behavior. 
Daniel Ryan as Bryn Brindsley. The local butcher and husband to Miriam. Bryn fought in the First World War and survived. However, he was scarred by the events and Miriam forbids him from enlisting again. He cares greatly for his family and offers advice to his son David, who is determined to enlist. 
Fenella Woolgar as Alison Scotlock. Alison is a member of the WI. She lost her husband George during WWI, and his name can be seen on the memorial wall. Frances tells her husband that the WI is essential in Alison's case, because if she was not a member she would never leave the house and her life would revolve around looking at the memorial wall and caring for her dog, Boris. 
Jodie Hamblet as Jenny Marshall. Jenny is the switchboard operator for Great Paxford and works alongside Pat. 
Jacqueline Pilton as Cookie. An elderly member of the WI. Cookie is kind and worries for the WI when it becomes corrupt and selfish under Joyce's rule. However, she shows a lot of happiness when Frances takes over and happily supports the newly reformed WI's movements. 
Alexandre Willaume as Marek Novotny.
Eileen Davies as Anne. The friend of Joyce and constant supporter of Mrs Cameron. 
Anthony Calf as Peter Barden. Peter is a businessman. He is the husband of Frances and very supportive of her acts in the WI. 
Mark Rowley as Stephen Banks. 
Sarah Thom as Jan Wilson, Spencer Wilson's mother.

Series 1 (2015)

Summary
When the WI is reformed by Frances Barden (Samantha Bond), she makes the committee less exclusive and more egalitarian; she is later voted as the official President. Meanwhile, Pat (Claire Rushbrook), a member of the committee, is being abused by her husband Bob, upon whom she is forced to wait hand and foot.  Bob becomes increasingly abusive as Pat finds herself and begins to be noticed by the town and her fellow WI members, sparking increased jealousy and anger in her husband, who blames her for his lack of the success he feels he deserves as a writer.

The newly reformed WI's first project is the gathering of wild blackberries which they then use to make jam, as "every pound of jam we make is a pound of jam that doesn't have to come in on the ships".

When war is officially declared, the men of the town begin to consider what roles they might play. Miriam's son, David, is determined to enlist in the Navy, which terrifies her. However, after a talk with his father, who fought in WWI, he accepts the idea that in order to soothe his mother's fears and give her as much time as possible to overcome them he should wait to be "called up" or drafted.

However, such is Miriam's fear of losing her son to war that when the National Registry form comes from the government, she deliberately leaves David's name off with the intention of keeping him out of the draft. When David discovers what she has done, he enlists in the Navy anyway. Shortly thereafter the Navy delivers an official letter which Miriam hides in a panic, assuming it is a notice of his death. She cannot face opening the letter and having her fears turn into immutable reality. However, when Bryn finds the hidden and unopened letter, it turns out they are reporting that he is only missing in action.  Grasping at straws, Miriam sees this as actually hopeful as it means the Navy is not sure of his death and that he may still be alive, though lost.

Dr Campbell finds he has lung cancer, preventing him from enlisting. His wife, who had been wishing for something to keep him out of the armed services, is horrified.

Spencer is drafted but registers as a conscientious objector. His friends and neighbors almost unilaterally begin to vilify and torment him. A mob gathers and coats his bicycle, which he uses to deliver the post, with blood and chicken feathers.  With the villagers shunning him, Claire worries for him. She gently persuades him that she is not afraid of the reactions of the other villagers and convinces him to let her stand at his side.

Alison takes as a tenant the new schoolteacher, Teresa Fenchurch. Later Teresa reveals herself to Alison as a lesbian.  Initially Alison is shocked but she overcomes her initial shock and reassures Teresa that she wants her to stay as Teresa has become her best (and nearly only) friend.

Steph worries for her husband when she realizes he feels he must join and fight. Eventually she confronts him and tells him to go, as he is gradually tearing himself apart over this decision.

When war becomes even more certain, Frances and the WI decide it is time for a community air raid shelter to be installed in case of an attack. In order to intercept Joyce's interference with this plan, Frances enlists Claire in a plot to misdirect Joyce by making her think they are planning to use the church as the town's air raid shelter.  Thus Joyce's efforts at stymieing Frances and the "new" WI, of which she strongly disapproves, are totally misdirected and the plan for the actual shelter proceeds without interference.

Teresa realizes that neither Steph nor her son can read and is in danger of losing the farm because, since she can't read them, she is not complying with government regulations about wartime farming.  She teaches Steph to read in order to save the family farm from confiscation due to noncompliance with government farming regulations.

In the final episode of the first series, Bob leaves for London, leaving Pat relieved and happy to be away from him, whilst Joyce leaves for the coast. She speaks with Frances over the war effort and hands over the keys to her tennis courts so that they may be used for food production.  As the series finishes the final scene hints at the war taking its toll in Great Paxford.

Episodes

(1939-1940)

Series 2 (2016)    

(1940)

Reception 

The first season had a consolidated average rating of 6.2 million viewers to date and a 24 per-cent share.[4] June 2015, ITV announced that it had ordered a second season of the programme. Samantha Bond was nominated for an award from the Satellite Awards. Season 2 met with similar success compared with Season 1 as the premiere episode gained 5.2 million overnight views, with the second episode reaching 4.7 million views.
Just days after the broadcast of the final episode of season 2, ITV announced it was cancelling the show and there would be no third season. A network spokesman said that despite the show's success, "the ITV commissioning team continues to refresh the channel's drama portfolio, hence the decision not to commission a further new season."

Fans gathered to protest the cancellation, and a Change.org petition to bring the show back was signed by over 50,000 viewers, but the campaign was ultimately unsuccessful.

Novelisation
After the series' cancellation, the writer continued the story as a novelisation. Published initially in July 2017 as an ebook (in 4 parts) from Amazon, the complete novel in book-format (originally planned for release in October 2017 ) was published in May 2018.

Broadcast
Home Fires first aired on 3 May 2015 on ITV. Internationally, the series premiered in Australia on 10 October 2015 on BBC First. The series premiered in the United States on 4 October 2015 on PBS.

References

External links
 

2015 British television series debuts
2016 British television series endings
2010s British drama television series
English-language television shows
Lesbian-related television shows
ITV television dramas
Television series by ITV Studios
Television series set in the 1940s
Television shows set in Cheshire
World War II television drama series